Imago clipeata (Latin: "portrait on a round shield") is a term in art usually used in reference to the images of ancestors, famous people or deceased on round shields (in Latin: clipeus). In the Roman world they were used to depict the ancestral family tree in patrician houses of the Republic as described by Pliny (Historia Naturalis 35: 4–11).

These shield portraits can be seen in architectural sculptural decorations, on sarcophagi and on standards of the Roman legions among many other types of representations in the Roman and Early Christian world.  In Italian Baroque imagery, medallion portraits supported by nymphs or genii came to signify an apotheosis. In this context they are often called tondi.

References

Ancient Roman sculpture
Sculpture techniques